Naftopidil (INN, marketed under the brand name Flivas) is a drug used in benign prostatic hypertrophy which acts as a selective α1-adrenergic receptor antagonist or alpha-1 blocker.

See also
 Urapidil

References

Alpha-1 blockers
Antihypertensive agents
Calcium channel blockers
N-(2-methoxyphenyl)piperazines
Naphthol ethers
Phenoxypropanolamines